Since his loss in the 1972 United States presidential election, there have been numerous allusions to George McGovern in American popular culture.

Allusions
In 2006, the film One Bright Shining Moment – The Forgotten Summer of George McGovern was released in the United States. Directed by Stephen Vittoria and narrated by Amy Goodman, the documentary chronicles the life and times of George McGovern, focusing on his 1972 bid for the presidency. The film features McGovern, Gloria Steinem, Gore Vidal, Warren Beatty, Howard Zinn and Dick Gregory.

McGovern is also prominently featured in the documentary films The U.S. vs. John Lennon (2006), Gonzo: The Life and Work of Dr. Hunter S. Thompson (2007), and Rush to War: Between Iraq and a Hard Place (2004), among other documentaries.

The films Nixon (1995), Dick (1999), All the President's Men (1976), Some Kind of Hero (1982), and The Seventies (2000 TV miniseries) reference McGovern and his 1972 presidential campaign.

In director Oliver Stone's Nixon, McGovern is repeatedly cited, including President Nixon (played by Anthony Hopkins) responding to southern conservatives and a right wing special interest group who threaten Nixon by taking away his campaign funds for the 1972 presidential campaign due to Nixon's policies on Cuba, the Environmental Protection Agency and détente with Communists. Nixon rebuts this by saying that if they don't like it then they can give their money to George Wallace. "Is that what you want John... to hand this country over to some pansy poet Socialist like George McGovern?" Nixon exclaims.  The film also includes television footage of McGovern campaigning and his defeat by Nixon.

In producer Robert Redford's All the President's Men, McGovern is described as "self-destructing" (along with Ed Muskie and Hubert Humphrey), and as offering the vice presidential spot to "everybody" following the Thomas Eagleton controversy.  The Nixon campaign's covert activities against the presidential campaigns of Muskie and Humphrey are attributed to Nixon's desire to run against McGovern.  The film is seasoned with television and newspaper coverage of McGovern's nomination and his handling of the Eagleton affair.  Both Nixon and All the President's Men make reference to an attempt by Nixon's campaign to plant McGovern literature on presidential candidate George Wallace's attempted assassin.

In The Seventies, one of the lead characters, as a staff member of the Committee to Re-elect the President (CREEP), executes its "dirty tricks" by sabotaging a McGovern press conference and infiltrating the McGovern-Shriver campaign's national headquarters as a "volunteer", where he sabotages their phone banking efforts and discloses information to CREEP.  He also complains to his friends, "McGovern writes poetry, for chrissake!"  The film includes television footage from McGovern's concession speech.

In Some Kind of Hero, prisoner-of-war Eddie Keller (played by Richard Pryor) is seen in his North Vietnamese cell reading the July 7, 1972, issue of Life magazine, with the cover story and photograph "An Outspoken Self-Portrait: George McGovern Talks" (even though the scene actually takes place in 1968.)

McGovern guest hosted and acted in several self-deprecating skits on Saturday Night Live on April 14, 1984, and guest starred as himself in an episode of the television series Newhart (original airdate February 5, 1990).  He played a dull caricature of himself in that Newhart episode. He also briefly appeared as himself in the film The Candidate (1972).

The television series All in the Family'''s third season episode 'Mike Comes Into Money', originally broadcast on November 4, 1972, is devoted to Mike and Gloria Stivic's volunteer work for, and donation to, McGovern's presidential campaign over Archie Bunker's strenuous objection. The earlier episode 'Archie's Fraud', broadcast on September 23, addresses McGovern's tax reform proposal and features supporters of his presidential campaign.

Comedian George Carlin said he voted for McGovern in 1972 and never voted again afterward.

In satirist-activist Dick Gregory's final nightclub performance album, Caught in the Act (recorded 8/2-8/4/73), he tells his Massachusetts audience, "Do you realize you were the only state that voted for McGovern?  You have the distinction of being able to tell the other forty-nine states, 'We told you'.  And I guess black folks are pretty cool too, because he also won Washington, D.C.  And when you can't win where you sleep, you are really in trouble."

In impersonator David Frye's album satirizing Watergate, Richard Nixon: A Fantasy (1973), he impersonates McGovern's response to capital punishment for casualties during an attempt by Nixon to escape from prison: "This is George McGovern, and I believe that killing is wrong.  But in this case, I'm willing to make an exception."

Charlie Daniels, in his 1973 country music song narrative, "Uneasy Rider", makes mention of George McGovern as an example of anti-establishment and leftist liberal groups of that era.  It contained the lyric, "Would you believe this guy has gone as far as tearing Wallace stickers from the bumpers of cars and he voted for George McGovern for president."

In the Burns and Schriever comedy album "The Watergate Comedy Hour" a Nixon campaign aide is told that the blame for the Watergate break-in will be taken "by a group of Cubans that we've convinced that McGovern is a Castro-loving commie pervert".

The alternate history short story collection Alternate Presidents contains two stories "Suppose They Gave a Peace..." by Susan Shwartz and "Paper Trail" by Brian M. Thomsen, both where McGovern wins the 1972 election against Nixon.

References

External links
 Trailer for the film One Bright Shining Moment
 McGovern discusses the film Nixon and its portrayal of him (w/director Oliver Stone and historian Arthur Schlesinger), American Historical Association forum, 1/4/97 (C-SPAN)
 Perspectives'', "Film and Media: George McGovern Reflects on Nixon" (column by George McGovern ), March 1996 issue (American Historical Association)
 McGovern and his '72 presidential campaign portrayed in All in the Family
 McGovern on MySpace

McGovern, George
McGovern, George
McGovern, George